Flax poseidon is a moth of the family Erebidae first described by Michael Fibiger in 2011. It is found in Indonesia (Sumatra).

The wingspan is 12-14.5 mm. The forewings are light brown, although the subterminal, terminal area and fringes are brown. There is a black-brown quadrangular patch in the upper medial area, with a small black dot in the outer-lower area. The base of the costa is black brown, subapically with small black dots. The crosslines are indistinct brown, except for the well-marked subterminal line and terminal line indicated by black-brown interveinal dots. The hindwings are grey with a discal spot. The underside of the forewings is unicolorous brown and the underside of the hindwings is grey with a discal spot.

References

Micronoctuini
Moths described in 2011
Taxa named by Michael Fibiger